The ECS G10IL is a netbook computer designed by ECS. Using an Intel Atom N270 processor, it includes a built-in tri-band HSDPA and HSUPA, the "Super 3G". The notebook is available with Linux or Windows XP.

In line with other ECS laptop products, it is expected that most sales of this computer will be through OEM channels, rebadged with other brand names.

For example, the G10IL was released in the UK in September 2008 as the Advent 4213, fitted with a 160Gb hard disk, 1Gb RAM and Windows XP.

Other versions are:
 FTEC eBook G10 – Malaysia
 Airis – France
 Averatec Buddy – United States
 Q10 Air – Austria
 Elisa Miniläppäri – Finland

Specifications
 CPU: Intel Atom N270 (aka "Diamondville")
 Chipset: Intel 945 GSE, ICH7M
 Operating System: Windows XP/Linux
 Memory: 1 slot SODIMM 200-pin DDR2 533/667, up to 2GB
 Screen: LCD Size 8.9" / 10.2" 1024 x 600 pixels
 Ports: 3xUSB 2.0, Card Reader (SD, SDHC, MMC, MS), VGA out
 Webcam: 1.3 mega pixel CCD
 Storage: HDD or SSD
 Battery: 4 / 6 cell
 Dimensions: 259 x 180 x 28.5 (mm)

References

See also 
Comparison of netbooks

Netbooks